Franciscodoras marmoratus is the only species in the genus Franciscodoras of the catfish (order Siluriformes) family Doradidae. This species is endemic to Brazil where it is found in the São Francisco River basin and reaches a length of  TL.

References

Doradidae
Monotypic freshwater fish genera
Catfish genera
Fish of South America
Fish of Brazil
Endemic fauna of Brazil
Fish described in 1874
Taxa named by Carl H. Eigenmann